Posești is a commune in Prahova County, Muntenia, Romania. It is composed of ten villages: Bodești, Merdeala, Nucșoara de Jos, Nucșoara de Sus, Poseștii-Pământeni (the commune centre), Poseștii-Ungureni, Târlești, Valea Plopului, Valea Screzii, and Valea Stupinii.

The commune is located in the northeastern part of the county, in the Sub Carpathian hills, on the border with Buzău County. The river Zeletin flows through the village Poseștii-Pământeni.

According to the 2011 census, Posești has 3,990 inhabitants; 95.54% of them are ethnic Romanians and 1.36% are ethnic Romani.

Natives
 Eufrosin Poteca (1786–1858), philosopher, theologian, and translator, was born in Nucșoara de Sus

References

Communes in Prahova County
Localities in Muntenia